Rhodobaenus is a genus of snout and bark beetles in the family Curculionidae. There are at least 130 described species in Rhodobaenus.

See also
 List of Rhodobaenus species

References

Further reading

External links

 

Dryophthorinae